Alfonso Rodríguez Vallejo (19 August 1943 – 3 December 2021) was a Spanish playwright, poet, painter and neurologist. He had published 34 plays and 25 poetry books. Vallejo was awarded the Lope de Vega prize in 1976 for his play "El desgüace". "Ácido Sulfúrico" was the runner up prize in 1975. In 1978 he received the Internacional Tirso de Molina prize for his work A Tumba Abierta. The Spanish Royal Academy (Real Academia Española), in 1981, awarded Vallejo the Fastenrath Award for "El cero transparente".

Vallejo's plays have been performed in many cities in Europe, the United States and South America. His works have also been translated into French, German, Arabic, Italian, Portuguese and Bulgarian.

Alfonso Vallejo was a Professor of Medical Pathology practising in one of the major hospitals in Madrid. He qualified as a medical doctor from the Universidad Complutense de Madrid in 1966 and continued his professional training in Spain, Britain, Germany, France and Denmark.

Biography

Early life and education
Alfonso Vallejo was born in Santander, Cantabria, Spain, in 1943. Between 1950 and 1961, Alfonso Vallejo was studying for both the French baccalauréat and the Spanish bachillerato at the Liceo Francés in Madrid.

After hearing a teacher, Mr. Bihoreau, read in class from “Invitation au voyage” by Baudelaire, Alfonso Vallejo understood that in this work one can find whatever is missing in life. From this moment onwards, his life took a new meaning: to write and create action and painting through words; to understand what makes man.

In 1958 Alfonso Vallejo spent the summer in Ushaw-Moor (Durham, UK), in 1962 in Darlington (UK) and 1963 in London. He also spent some time living in France, Germany, Britain and Italy and can read and write the respective languages of these countries. Alfonso Vallejo has also worked in different hospitals in France, Britain, Germany, Belgium and Denmark.

Between 1961 and 1966 Alfonso Vallejo studied and obtained his medical degree from the Universidad Complutense de Madrid. In 1968 he sat for the Foreign Medical Examination (ECFMG) to work in the USA. In 1970, Alfonso Vallejo finished his specialization in neurology and in 1977 presented his doctoral theses in medicine at the Universidad Autónoma de Madrid.

Medical career
Alfonso Vallejo was (1971–1973) an assistant professor of neurology for Dr Portera at the Clinico Hospital, Madrid. In 1973 he was appointed head of Clinical Neurology (Neurology, Dr. Portera), at a leading Hospital in Madrid.

Between 1975 and 1985 Alfonso Vallejo was associate professor of neurology at the Universidad Complutense de Madrid. Through a public examination in 1985, Alfonso Vallejo obtained the title of Professor of Medical Pathology. He still occupied these positions at the same hospital.

During his stays abroad, from 1966 to 1977 Alfonso Vallejo worked with a number of renowned specialists in Heidelberg, London, Amberes, Copenhagen, Berlin and Paris.

Artistic career
Alfonso Vallejo started writing poems and plays in 1957. His first play was "Cycle" (1961) which he directed in 1963 with French actors at the French Institute in Madrid.

Director of the University Theatre, at the Faculty of Medicine, Universidad Complutense de Madrid, between 1962 and 1964.

Some of the plays written between 1961 and 1973: “La sal de la tierra”, “El Bernardo”, “La Mentala”, “El Rodrigüello”, “Morituri”, “Los toros de Guisando”, “El Tiznao”, “El desterrado” (The Salt of the earth), El Bernardo, La Mentala, El Rodrigüello, Morituri ("We who are about to die"), The Bull of Guisando,(Exile).

Unpublished plays written after 1973: “Passion- time” (in French) (1974), “Night-Syndrome”(1980), “Angustias”(1981) (Anguishes), "Mamuts” (1982) (Mammoths).

The author of two unpublished long novels and some short novels.

Alfonso Vallejo developed his artistic career by skilfully mastering how to write plays and poetry and how to paint.

International Recognition
Some of Alfonso Vallejo's works have been translated into English, French, German, Arabic, Italian, Portuguese, Polish, Bulgarian and continue to be translated. He was awarded the runner-up prize of the Lope de Vega Prize in 1975 for his play “Acido Sulfúrico”, the National Lope de Vega Prize in 1976 for his play “El Desgüace”, the International Tirso de Molina Prize in 1978 for “A tumba abierta” and the Fastenrath de la Real Academia Española Prize (Fastenrath Prize of the Royal Spanish Academy, 1981) for "El Cero Transparente", which was the libretto for the opera Kiu (1973) by Luis de Pablo. Alfonso Vallejo's plays have been performed in New York, Miami, Mexico and South American countries, Portugal, United Kingdom, France, Germany, Italy, Poland, many other countries.

Plays

Vallejo is the author of about fifty plays and some of the most notable are: 
Fly-By (1973); Passion-time, escrita en francés (1974); El desgüace (1974); Psss (1974);
Ácido sulfúrico (1975); Latidos (1975); A tumba abierta (1976); Monólogo para seis voces sin sonido (1976); El cero transparente (1977); Premio Fastenraht de la Real Academia (1980), y que constituyó el libreto de la ópera Kiu (1983) de Luis de Pablo; Eclipse (1977); Infratonos (1978); La espalda del círculo (1978); Cangrejos de pared (1979); Night-Syndrome (1980);Angustias (1981); Hölderlin (1981);
Orquídeas y panteras (1982); Mamuts (1982); Gaviotas subterráneas (1983); Sol ulcerado (1983); Monkeys (1984); Week-end (1985); Espacio interior (1986); Tuatú (1989);
Tobi-después (1991; Crujidos (1995); Kora (1996); Jindama (1998);
Ébola Nerón (1999); Panic (2001); Greta en la confesión (2001); La inmolación, monólogo corto (2002);
Hiroshima-Sevilla (2002); Jasmín, monólogo corto (2003); Culpable¿ (2003); Soraya, monólogo corto (2004); Katacumbia (2004);
Irstel, monólogo corto (2005); Una nueva mujer (2006); El escuchador de hielo (2006).

Published works

Plays
  Fundamentos, 1978. Prologue: José Monleón.
  Fundamentos, 1979. Prologue: Miguel Bilbatúa.
  De la Torre, 1980. Prologue: Enrique Llovet.
  Fundamentos, 1985. Prologue: Ángel Fernández Santos.

  Preyson, 1985.
  La Avispa, Colección Teatro. n.º 21.
Slaughter, (Latidos). The Scene, n.º 4. Nueva York, 1977.
 Translated to Bulgarian by Stephan Tanev. Anthology of Contemporary Authors. Sofia (Bulgaria).
  Fundamentos, 1987. Prologue: Enrique Llovet.
 Biblioteca Antonio Machado, 1988.
 Universidad de Murcia, 1988. Prologue: Alfonso Vallejo.
 Translated to Polish by Ursula Aszyk. Dialog, n.º 6, 1987.
Hölderlin. First Act, n.º 205.
Tobi-después. Theatrical Art, n.º 3, 1991.
Train to Kiu, (El cero transparente). Translation by Rick Hite. Foreign, Contemporary Spanish Play, 1995.
  Fundamentos, 1996. Prologue: Ursula Aszyk.
  Fundamentos, 1996. Prologue: Ursula Aszyk.
Kora. Bookshop Antonio Machado, 1998.
  Alhulia, 1998. Prologue: César Oliva.
  ESAD de Murcia, 1999. Prologue: María Francisca Vilches de Frutos.
 Avispa, 2001.  Prologue: Francisco Gutiérrez Carbajo.
  AAT/Teatro, 2001.
  AAT/Teatro.
  AAT/Teatro, 2003. Prologue: Enrique LLovet.
  AAT/Teatro.
  AAT/Teatro.
  AAT/Teatro.
. University of Alcalá de Henares. Prologue: Mar Rebollo Calzada.
 Translated to Arabic by Khaled Salem and Ranya Rabbat. Cairo University, 2005.
  and Prologue: Francisco Gutiérrez Carbajo.
  and Prologue: Francisco Gutiérrez Carbajo.
  AAT, 2007. Prologue: Francisco Gutiérrez Carbajo.
"Ka-OS". El Teatro de Papel. nº 13, 1/2011. Primer Acto.
"Duetto (Diez asaltos y un desliz, para un actor y una actriz) (2013)Edición y prólogo Francisco Gutiérrez Carbajo
"Tiempo de indignación" (2013)Edición y prólogo: Francisco Gutiérrez Carbajo

Poetry

(Books are in Spanish, but the title is given in English for convenience.)

The poetry of Alfonso Vallejo
Desgarro, Esencia y Pasión (Boastfulness, Essence and Passion)
From the book by Francisco Gutiérrez Carbajo:
(Critical Study and anthology) :Publishers: Huerga y Fierro. Madrid 2005

1 The First Poems. (written between 1957 and 1963)

2 The place of the cold land :Publisher Ágora (1969) Madrid

3 Molecules :Publisher Castilla (1976) Madrid

4 Lunar Fire :Publisher Ayuso. Colección Endimión (1988) Madrid

5 More :Publisher Endymión. (1990) Madrid

6 Interior flesh :Publisher Libertarias (1994) Madrid

7 Materica light :Publisher Libertarias/Prodhufi.(1994)

8 Clarity in action :Publisher Huerga y Fierro (1995). Madrid (Prologue by Francisco Nieva)

9 Blue Sun :Publisher Huerga y Fierro (1997). Madrid (Prologue by Carlos Bousoño)

10 End of the century and fear propagation :Publisher Alhulia (1999). Salobreña. Granada. (Prologue by Oscar Barrero Pérez)

11 Eternity at every instant :Publisher Huerga and Fierro (2000) Madrid (Edition and Prologue by Francisco Gutiérrez Carbajo)

12 White darkness :Publisher Huerga and Fierro. Madrid 2001. Edition and prologue by Francisco Gutiérrez Carbajo Madrid

13 To be Plutonic :Publisher Huerga y Fierro. (2002) Edition and prologue Francisco Gutiérrez Carbajo. Madrid

14 Astral Compass :Publisher Huerga y Fierro (2003). Edition and Prologue: Francisco Gutiérrez Carbajo. Madrid

15 Labyrinths-Investigation 40. Orso. Bari, Italy. Emilio Coco. In “I Quaderni Di Abanico” (2003). Translated by Emilio Coco. Italian anthology of poetry with selections from the last fourteen books. :Publisher Levante. Bari. Prologue: Francisco Gutiérrez Carbajo

16 Trans consciousness and desire :Publisher Huerga and Fierro. (2004) Edition and prologue: Francisco Gutiérrez Carbajo. Madrid

17 Escence and Prereality :Publisher Huerga and Fierro. Edition and Prologue: Francisco Gutiérrez Carbajo. Madrid (2005)

18 Instinct intuition and Truth :Publisher Huerga and Fierro, Edition and prologue: Francisco Gutiérrez Carbajo

19 Fantasy and Injustice :Publisher Huerta and Fierro. (2006) Edition and prologue by Francisco Gutiérrez Carbajo

20 “Twilight zone, quimeria and passion” :Publisher Huerga and Fierro. (In the press.) Edition January 2008.Edition and prologue by Francisco Gutiérrez Carbajo
Enigma y develación. Ed. Huerga y Fierro, 2009. Edición y prólogo: Francisco Gutiérrez Carbajo.
Transvivencia y plenitud. Ed. Huerga y Fierro, 2010. Edición y prólogo: Francisco
Gutiérrez Carbajo.
" Tiempo silencio y verdad" . Ed .Huerga y Fierro, 2011. Edición y Prólogo: Francisco
Gutiérrez Carbajo.
"Avventura-Verità.50".(en I Quaderni Di Abanico). Italia. Bari. Traducción de Emilio Coco. Antología de poesía traducida al italiano. 2011. Edición y prólogo: Francisco Gutiérrez Carbajo.
"Ser, cerebro y realidad". Ed. Huerga y Fierro,2012. Edicion y prólogo: Francisco Gutiérrez Carbajo.
"Utopía y realidad". Impreso en Nuevo Zorita S.L (2012). Edición y prólogo: Francisco Gutiérrez Carbajo.
"Sin principio ni final" Ed. Infocultiva Libros. (2013). Edición y prógo: Francisco Gutiérrez Carbajo.
"Homo ciber digitalis". Ed. Infocultiva Libros (2013). Edición y prólogo: Francisco Gutiérrez Carbajo.
"Homo ciber digitalis" (2013)Edición y prólogo: Francisco Gutiérrez Carbajo
Magnitud y dimensión" (2013)Edición y prólogo: Francisco Gutiérrez Carbajo
"Aire, tierra, mar y... sueños" (2014) Editorial Abey . Edición y prólogo: Francisco Gutiérrez Carbajo

21 "Después" Alfonso Vallejo (2020) Edición y prólogo Francisco Gutiérrez Carbajo

Paintings: solo art exhibitions
Madrid (1983, 1988, 1992, 1997)

Zaragoza (1991)

Aranjuez (2004)

Aranjuez (2005)

Alcorcón (2007)

Madrid (28 February 2008)

Cuenca (July–August 2008)

Cuenca (November 2009)

Awards
 Runner-up prize of the Premio Lope de Vega 1975 for Ácido Sulfúrico (1975)
 Premio Lope de Vega 1976 for El desguace, (1974)
 Premio Internacional Tirso de Molina 1978 for A Tumba Abierta (1976)
 Premio Fastenrath de la Real Academia, 1981 for El Cero Transparente (1977)

Reviews, commentaries and critiques
Prof. Francisco Gutiérrez Carbajo, Professor of Literature at the UNED University, Spain, has been a prolific commentator and reviewer of the works by Alfonso Vallejo. Besides the various forewords Francisco Gutiérrez Carbajo has written for the published works by Vallejo or commentaries published on the plays and poetry by Vallejo, Gutiérrez has also published a critique and anthology of Vallejo's poetry: “La Poesía de Alfonso Vallejo: desgarro, esencia y pasión” (The poetry of Alfonso Vallejo: development, essence and passion”. Huerga y Fierro (2005). Madrid.

The following list of references is a collection of the various reviewers, commentators and critics who had the opportunity to write about Alfonso Vallejo's works.

Spanish reviews, commentaries and critiques
Alvaro, Francisco, “El cero transparente de Alfonso Vallejo”. El espectador y la crítica. El teatro en España en 1980, prólogo de Fernando Lázaro Carreter, año XXIII, Valladolid, 1981, pp. 35–42.

Amestoy, Ignacio, “Sol ulcerado. Gaviotas Subterráneas: burladores y burlados en el teatro de Alfonso Vallejo”, Primer Acto, 251 (1993), pp. 16–17.

Aszyk, Ursula. (1997)  Madrid. Espiral /Fundamentos.

Barrero Pérez, Oscar, (1992). “Notas sobre la poesía de Alfonso Vallejo” En Alfonso Vallejo, “Fin de siglo y cunde el miedo” Salobreña. Alhulia, pp. 7–13.

Bayón, Miguel, “Alfonso Vallejo: el único arte que suda es el teatro”, Pipirijaina, 13 (198º), pp. 12–15.

Bayón, Miguel, “TEC. El calvario hacia el local que no existe” Pipirijaina, 13 (1980), pp. 17–18.

Berenguer, Angel y Pérez, Manuel, Historia del Teatro Español del Siglo XX, vol IV: Tendencias del Teatro Español durante la Transición Política (1975. 1982) Madrid, Biblioteca Nueva, 1998, págs, 138-139.

Bilbatúa; Miguel, “Alfonso Vallejo, un teatro de la desintegración”, en Alfonso Vallejo, “Monólogo para seis voces sin sonido. Infratonos. A tumba abierta”, Madrid, Fundamentos (Colección Espiral, 49), 1979, pp. 7–13.

Bousoño, Carlos. Prólogo a “Sol azul”. Edit. Huerga y Fierro. (1997). Madrid.

Centeno, Enrique (1996) (Ed.). La escena española actual (Crónica de una década. 1984-1994). Madrid: SGAE.

Diaz Sande, José Ramón, Reseña, 124 (January–February 1980), pp. 16–19.

Fernández Santos, Angel, “Las huellas de la tragedia romántica”, en Alfonso Vallejo, “Monkeys. Gaviotas Subterráneas”, Madrid, Fundamentos (Colección Espiral, 93), 1985, pp. 7–13.

Fernández Torres, Alberto, “El cero transparente, Alfonso Vallejo/TEC. Sí pero no” Pipirijaina, 14 (1980), pp. 46–47.

Fundamentos. (2003) pp 220–221.

Gabriele, John P. “Alfonso Vallejo: reflexiones de un dramaturgo solitario” Estreno. Vol. XXXI, NO. 2 . pp. 39–42.

Gabriele, John P. “Memory, Trauma and the Postmodern Self in Alfonso´s Vallejo “Panic”. Hispanic Journal 28.2 (2007) :53-66

Gabriele, John P. “Panic”. Estreno. Vol XXX, NO 1. Primavera 2004. pp 43–44.

Garcia Osuna, Alfonso J. “El otro lado de la palabra: Alfonso Vallejo y El cero transparente”. Letras Hispanas.

Gomez Garcia, Manolo (1996).  (1991–2000). Valencia. Asociación de autores de teatro.

Gómez Ortiz, Manuel, “Un grito de rabia y esperanza: El cero transparente de Alfonso Vallejo en el Círculo de Bellas Artes” Ya (14 March 1980), p. 49.

Gutiérrez Carbajo, Francisco, “El mundo clásico en Ébola-Nerón de Alfonso Vallejo y en El Romano de José Luis Alonso de Santos, en Costas Rodríguez, Jenaro, ed. Al amicam amicissime scripta: homenaje a la profesora María José López de Ayala y Genovés, Madrid, Universidad Nacional de Educación a Distancia, 2005.

Gutiérrez Carbajo, Francisco:

-Prólogo de “Blanca oscuridad”. Edit. Huerga y Fierro. (2001). Madrid.

-Prólogo de “Brujulario Astral”. Edit. Huerga y Fierro. (2003). Madrid.

-Prólogo de “Esencia y Prerrealidad”. Edit. Huerga y Fierro(2005). Madrid.

-Prólogo de “Eternamente a cada instante”. Edit. Huerga y Fierro. (2000). Madrid.

-Prólogo de “Instuinstinto y verdad”. Edit. Huerga y Fierro. (2006). Madrid.

-Prólogo de “Laberinto-Indagine 40”. Edit. Levante Editori. Bari.

-Prólogo de “Panic”. Editorial la Avispa (2001)

-Prólogo de “Plutónico ser”. Edit. Huerga y Fierro. (2002). Madrid.

-Prólogo de “Transconciencia y deseo” Edit. Huerga y Fierro. (2004). Madrid.

-Prólogo de “Fantasía y sinrazón”. Edit. Huerga y Fierro. (En prensa)

Gutiérrez Carbajo, Francisco, “Elementos autobiográficos en el teatro de Alfonso Vallejo”. En J. Romera (Ed.) y F. Gutiérrez Carbajo (Colaborador (2003). Teatro y memoria en la segunda mitad del siglo XX. Madrid: Visor-Libros, 2003.

Gutiérrez Carbajo, Francisco :Introduzione a “Labirinto-Indagine 40 (Laberinto-Indagación 40).” de Alfonso Vallejo. Bari: Levante Editori, 2003, pp. 7–81.

Gutiérrez Carbajo, Francisco, “La Poesía de Alfonso Vallejo: desgarro, esencia y pasión”. Estudio crítico y antología. Huerga y Fierro (2005). Madrid.

Gutiérrez Carbajo, Francisco, “Miedo y globalización. Panic e Hiroshima-Sevilla.6 A, de Alfonso Vallejo”, en Actas del Congreso Internacional “Insularidad, Globalización y Medios de Comunicación”, dela Asociación Internacional de Semiótica, Tenerife, Unviversidad de la Laguna, 2006.

Gutiérrez Carbajo, Francisco, “Mundo y transrealidad en la poesía de Alfonso Vallejo”. Introducción a Transconciencia y deseo, de Alfonso Vallejo, Madrid, Huerga & Fierro, 2004, pp. 5–20.

Gutiérrez Carbajo, Francisco, “Pragmática Teatral. Alfonso Vallejo”, en Anales de Literatura Española, 17 (2004), Alicante, Departamento de Filología Española, Lingüística General y Teoría de la Literatura, PP. 73–88.

Gutiérrez Carbajo, Francisco. (1999), “Contrautopía y situaciones-límite: el teatro de Alfons Vallejo”. Actas del Congreso Internacional de la Sociedad Latinoamericana de Semiótica. La Coruña. Universidad de la Coruña.

Gutiérrez Carbajo, Francisco. “La escritura teatral de Alfonso Vallejo”. TEATRO. Revista de estudios teatrales. Junio 1998-Junio 2001. Universidad de Alcalá. pp. 29–69.

Gutiérrez Carbajo, Francisco. Teatro Contemporáneo: Alfonso Vallejo. Madrid UNED, 2001.

Haro Tecglen, Eduardo, “El cero transparente. En el mundo del símbolo eterno.” El País (13 de marzo de 1980), pp. 16–17.

Layton, William, “A propósito de El cero transparente” Pipirijaina, 13 (1980), pp. 16–17.

Lopez Sancho, Lorenzo, ABC, 13 March 1980, pp. 29–30.

Llovet, Enrique, “Prólogo” a Alfonso Vallejo, “Cangrejos de pared. Latidos. Eclipse”, Madrid, Ediciones de la Torre, 1980, pp. 7–13.

Llovet, Enrique, Prólogo a “Espacio interior. Week-End.” Madrid. Colección Espiral, 122. Edit. Fundamentos (1988)pp. 7–8.

Llovet, Enrique-Prólogo a “Hiroshima-Sevilla. 6A”. Ediciones A.A.T (2003)

Martín Sabas, “Tres manifestaciones teatrales: Delibes, Cervantes-Nieva y Alfonso Vallejo”, Cuadernos Hispanoamericanos, 363 (Septiembre 1980), pp. 604–614.

Martín, Sabas, “El teatro de Alfonso Vallejo” Cuadernos Hispanoamericanos, 416 (1985), pp. 7–8.

Medina Vicario, Miguel, “Con Alfonso Vallejo: el drama poliédrico”, Primer Acto, Madrid, 205 (septiembre-octubre de 1984) pp. 75–79.

Medina Vicario, Miguel. “Veinticinco años de Teatro Español (1973-2000).

Monleón, José, “Alfonso Vallejo, todo menos haber estrenado en España”, en Alfonso Vallejo,”El cero transparente. Acido Sulfúrico. El desgüace”, Madrid, Fundamentos (Colección Espiral, 439, 1978, PP. 7–15.

Monleón, José, “El cero transparente” Triunfo, 895 (22 de marzo de 19809 PP. 40–41.

Nieva, Francisco. Prólogo a “Claridad en acción”. Edit. Huerga y Fierro. (1995). Madrid.

Oliva, César (1989) “El teatro desde 1936. Historia de la literatura española actual, 3. Madrid: Alhambra.

Oliva, César. Introducción a “Jindama” de Alfonso Vallejo. Edit. Alhulia. Salobreña. Granada. (1998).

Oliva, César. “El teatro”. En Francisco Rico. Historia y crítica de la Literatura Española. Vol 9.Darío Villanueva y otros. Los nuevos nombres. Barcelona. Crítica. pp. 432–458.

Población, Félix, “Alfonso Vallejo: “Me apoyo en las palabras pero escribo sobre la vida” “m El Público, 43 (abril 1987), pp. 43-44.

Prego, Adolfo, Blanco y Negro, 3.542 (19 al 25 de Marzo de 19809, pp. 50.51.

Ragué-Arias, María José, “El teatro de fin de milenio en España (de 1975 hasta hoy) Barcelona, Ariel, 1996, págs, 193-194.

Rebollo Calzada, Mar. Introducción a “Katacumbia” de Alfonso Vallejo. Revista de Teatro. Colección Textos/Teatro. Universidad de Alcalá. (2004) pp. 7–26.

Ruggeri Marchetti, Magda: La psicología del hombre. Vallejo Alfonso. Culpable y Psss. (Edición y prólogo de Francisco Gutiérrez Carbajo.

En : De Assaig Teatre. Núm. 56. p 289-291

Sánchez Agular, Agustín, “El cero transparente de Alfonso Vallejo”En Aznar Soler, Manuel (ed) “Veinte años de teatro y democracia en España (1975-1995), Sant Cugat del Vallés, Cop d´’idees-CITEC, 1996, págs, 89-94.

Santa-Cruz, Lola, “Alfonso Vallejo: teatro para hambrientos”, El Público, 9 (junio de 1984),pp. 26–27.

Vallejo, Alfonso, “La grandeza del actor” Revista de la Unión de Actores, n. 58, pp. 27–29. (2000)

Vilches De Frutos, María Francisca. Introducción a “Ebola- Nerón” de Alfonso Vallejo. Edit: ESAD de Murcia. (1999)

International Reviews, Commentaries and Critiques

Aszyk, Ursula, “Between the Crisis and the Vanguard”. Studies on Spanish Theatre in the twentieth Century, Warsaw, Professor of Iberian Studies. University of Warsaw. 1995, pp. 200–203.

Coco, Emilio (2000) Contemporary Spanish Theatre. Volume 2. Edizioni dell´Orso.

De Toro, A, Floeck W. (1995) Contemporary Spanish Theatre. Authors and Tendencies. Kassel: Reichenberger.

Egger, Carole. “Le théâtre contemporain espagnol. Approche méthodologique et analyses de textes. “Presses Universitaires de Rennes. Université de Aix en Provence. pp. 139–146.

Italian and Spanish, Bari, Levante Editori, Italia, 2003.

In the media
'El cero transparente' de Alfonso Vallejo en Torrelavega , 6 December 2008, in laguiago.com 

Simplemente irresistible, Diario Público , Lourdes Gómez - Corresponsal Londres - 26 October 2008 08:00 

El IV Certamen Nacional de Teatro Aficionado 'Paco Rabal' de Águilas comienza hoy con el montaje 'El Pendón Coronado', Europa Press  (no date line is given for this article, but probably November 2007) 

Alfonso Vallejo «La televisión está llena de humor barato», Gema Eizaguirre. 6 September 2005, in 20minutos.es 

Bufanda blanca para Valle-Inclán en el Día Mundial del Teatro, ABC.es  28 March 2002 

Crujidos, de Alfonso Vallejo. EL MUNDO , 16 de junio de 2000 

The Subject is 'Orchids' - And Laughter,  Miami Herald  - 11 April 1987 

Palm Beach Daily News - 9 April 1987 (GoogleNews link to report Orchids and Panthers) 

Alfonso Vallejo estrena en el Español 'Orquídeas y panteras', Madrid - 25 May 1984 ELPAIS.com 

El teatro Español inicia la temporada con el recuerdo del Corral del Príncipe y montajes de Shakespeare y Calderón, Madrid - ELPAIS.com, 15 September 1983 

Ignacio Amestoy estrena 'Ederra', una 'tragedia clásica' último premio Lope de Vega de teatro, ELPAIS.com, Madrid - 19 May 1983, CRÍTICA,  

El dramaturgo Alfonso Vallejo estrena en el extranjero,  ELPAIS.com  30 June 1982 

Alfonso Vallejo: "Cuando empecé a escribir teatro sabía que me adentraba en una larga enfermedad"
Tras veinte años se prepara, por fin, el estreno de una de sus obras
JOSÉ F. 6 October 1979, ELPAIS.com, Cultura 

Alfonso Vallejo, premio Lope de Vega - El ganador presentó siete obras y fue finalista con tres - in ELPAIS.com 29 May 1977

External links
Alfonso Vallejo - Selección de textos  Biblioteca de Author de Alfonso Vallejo, Asociación de Autores de Teatro de España, semblanza crítica, catálogo de obras teatrales, bibliografía Fundación Biblioteca Virtual Miguel de Cervantes 

Alfonso Vallejo,  Caos Editorial

References

 Wikipedia Spanish Entry:
Alfonso Vallejo (dramaturgo). (2008, 19) de julio. Wikipedia, La enciclopedia libre. Fecha de consulta: 12:26, julio 27, 2008 from 

 News report from the Spanish Newspaper EL PAÍS on the Premier of "Acido sulfúrico" in Spain. EL PAÍS - Cultura 22 March 1981 Estreno de "Acido sulfúrico" de Alfonso Vallejo.

"El cero transparente" is included in the Teatro Estable Castellano, Madrid, for the 1979 season. Mentioned in an article in the Spanish newspaper EL PAÍS. EL PAÍS - Cultura 7 July 1979 "El TEC prepara la próxima temporada" 

 John P. Gabriele, The College of Wooster
"Memory, Trauma, and the Postmodern Self in Alfonso Vallejo’s Panic" (Abstract)
Hispanic Journal. VOL 28 NO. 2 

 - Leonard Zelig had a starring role in a production of Fly-By at the
Catarsis Teatro, Venezuela, 2001

"Rick Seyford, A Note on the Play" and a note about the Translator 
Train to Kiu [El cero transparente]. Tr. Rick Hite.
School of Arts & Humanities
University of Texas at Dallas 

 Official Website of Alfonso Vallejo 

 ALFONSO-Exhibition Feb 2008, Copy of official catalogue available on this site. 

 Alfonso Vallejo, CUENCA 2008 Copy of official catalogue available on this site.

 Alfonso exposición en Cuenca 26 November 2009 Copy of official catalogue available on this site. 

  Lope de Vega, Prize for Theatre 

 Article in El Pais (in Spanish: Alfonso Vallejo: "Cuando empecé a escribir teatro sabía que me adentraba en una larga enfermedad"
Tras veinte años se prepara, por fin, el estreno de una de sus obras
José F. 6 October 1979, ELPAIS.com, Cultura 

 El otro lado de la palabra: Alfonso Vallejo y El cero transparente. Alfonso J. García Osuna Kingsborough College, The City University of New York. 

1943 births
2021 deaths
People from Santander, Spain
Artists from Cantabria
Writers from Cantabria
Complutense University of Madrid alumni
Spanish dramatists and playwrights
Spanish male dramatists and playwrights
Spanish poets
Autonomous University of Madrid alumni
Spanish male poets